The Texas Rangers 1997 season involved the Rangers finishing 3rd in the American League West with a record of 77 wins and 85 losses.  Despite not making the playoffs the club would set an all-time attendance record of over 2.945 million fans, which would be the franchise's best until 2011.

On a somber note, the club would lose long-time radio broadcaster Mark Holtz to leukemia during the season; however, in his final game in May the Rangers won, allowing him to sign off one final time with his trademark "Hello Win Column!".

Offseason
 December 10, 1996: Billy Ripken was signed as a free agent by the Rangers.
 December 16, 1996: Scott Bailes was signed as a free agent with the Texas Rangers.
 December 19, 1996: Mike Simms was signed as a free agent by the Rangers.
 March 27, 1997: Dave Silvestri was selected off waivers by the Rangers from the Seattle Mariners.

Regular season
 June 12, 1997: The first interleague game took place as the Texas Rangers hosted the San Francisco Giants at The Ballpark in Arlington (now Globe Life Park).

Opening Day starters
Mark McLemore, 2B

Iván Rodríguez, C

Rusty Greer, LF

Dean Palmer, 3B

Lee Stevens, 1B

Mickey Tettleton, DH

Warren Newson, RF

Damon Buford, CF

Benji Gil, SS

Season standings

Record vs. opponents

Notable transactions
 April 16, 1997: Alex Diaz was signed as a free agent by the Rangers.
 June 20, 1997: Todd Van Poppel was signed as a free agent by the Rangers.
 July 29, 1997: Ken Hill was traded by the Rangers to the Anaheim Angels for Jim Leyritz and a player to be named later. The Angels completed the deal by sending Rob Sasser to the Rangers on October 31.

Draft picks
 June 3, 1997: Mike Lamb was drafted by the Rangers in the 7th round of the 1997 Major League Baseball draft. Player signed June 6, 1997.

Roster

Player stats

Batting

Starters by position
Note: Pos = Position; G = Games played; AB = At bats; H = Hits; Avg. = Batting average; HR = Home runs; RBI = Runs batted in

Other batters
Note: G = Games played; AB = At bats; H = Hits; Avg. = Batting average; HR = Home runs; RBI = Runs batted in

Pitching

Starting pitchers 
Note: G = Games pitched; IP = Innings pitched; W = Wins; L = Losses; ERA = Earned run average; SO = Strikeouts

Other pitchers 
Note: G = Games pitched; IP = Innings pitched; W = Wins; L = Losses; ERA = Earned run average; SO = Strikeouts

Relief pitchers 
Note: G = Games pitched; W = Wins; L = Losses; SV = Saves; ERA = Earned run average; SO = Strikeouts

Awards and honors
Juan González, Silver Slugger Award
Iván Rodríguez, C, Gold Glove
Iván Rodríguez, Silver Slugger Award
All-Star Game

Farm system

References

1997 Texas Rangers at Baseball Reference
1997 Texas Rangers at Baseball Almanac

Texas Rangers seasons
Texas Rangers season
Range